Bra vibrationer (English: Good Vibrations) is a studio album from Kikki Danielsson, released in April 1985. The album reached number 12 on the Swedish Albums Chart.

Track listing

Side A

Side B

Charts

References

1985 albums
Kikki Danielsson albums
Swedish-language albums